The Ministry of Youth and Sports is the Moroccan ministry responsible for the sectors of youth and sports to ensure the protection of youth and preparing government policy for the development of sport.

Youth and sports sector 
The Ministry is responsible for preparing and implementing government policy in the areas of youth, sports, childhood and women in accordance with the current laws and regulations. It develops strategies to raise the level of association work and disseminates them, ensuring the protection of youth and their integration into society and develops activities enhancing national, regional and international cooperation in the fields of youth, childhood and women's affairs. It prepares government policy for the development and generalization of sport, coordinating and monitoring all sports activities at national level and develops strategic mechanisms for the advancement of high-level competitive sport. The Ministry also raises awareness of the importance of sport for the national economy, appealing economic actors to contribute to its development and establishes the necessary partnerships to implement sports, socio-educational and youth facilities, ensures the establishment of management processes, maintenance and control of property and institutions affiliated with the Ministry and coordinates and ensures the participation of national sports teams in international, regional and continental sports competitions with the Moroccan National Olympic Committee, the National Paralympic Committee and the sports universities.

Another part is to coordinate programs combatting doping in sport and violence during competitions and sporting events.

See also 

 Government of Morocco

References

External links 

 Website

Government ministries of Morocco